Myroslav Ihnatyuk (born February 2, 1957) is a Ukrainian sport shooter. He competed at the Summer Olympics in 1992 and 1996. In 1992, he placed sixth in the men's 25 metre rapid fire pistol event, and in 1996, he placed ninth in the men's 25 metre rapid fire pistol event.

References

1957 births
Living people
ISSF pistol shooters
Ukrainian male sport shooters
Shooters at the 1992 Summer Olympics
Shooters at the 1996 Summer Olympics
Olympic shooters of the Unified Team
Olympic shooters of Ukraine
20th-century Ukrainian people